Théo Derot (born 17 June 1992) is a French handball player who plays for Pays d'Aix UCH and the French national team.

He participated at the 2016 European Men's Handball Championship.

References

1992 births
Living people
French male handball players
Sportspeople from Nîmes
Handball players at the 2010 Summer Youth Olympics